James William Russell (1 August 1931 – 12 March 1969) was an Australian rules footballer who played with North Melbourne in the Victorian Football League (VFL).

Notes

External links 

1931 births
1969 deaths
Australian rules footballers from Melbourne
North Melbourne Football Club players
People from Carlton North, Victoria